Tom Switzer (born 1971) is the executive director of the  Centre for Independent Studies, a Sydney-based libertarian public-policy research think tank that focuses on classical liberal issues. He is also the host of Between the Lines on the Australian Broadcasting Corporation's Radio National and a columnist at the Sydney Morning Herald and Australian Financial Review.

Early life and education
Switzer was born in 1971 in Dallas, Texas, and grew up in Sydney. He attended St Aloysius' College in Kirribilli, where he was an Australian schools track and field champion in 1989, and was trained by Australian Olympic coach Jackie Byrnes. He graduated with a Bachelor of Arts in History (First Class Honours) in 1993; and a Masters in International Relations in 1994; both from the University of Sydney.

Career
He is a former senior associate at the University of Sydney's United States Studies Centre (2009–17), editor of The Spectator Australia (2009-2014), opinion editor for The Australian (2001-2008), editorial writer at the Australian Financial Review (1998-2001) and assistant editor at the American Enterprise Institute in Washington, DC (1995-1998).

In 2008, he was senior adviser to federal Liberal Party leader Brendan Nelson until the leadership spill that resulted in Nelson's defeat by Malcolm Turnbull. In 2009, after Nelson resigned from Parliament, Switzer was a candidate to replace him in the by-election and received endorsements from John Howard, Tony Abbott and Peter Costello. Switzer was defeated in the fifth round, with Paul Fletcher selected as eventual candidate.

Switzer's analysis of Australian politics has been published in international media, including The Wall Street Journal in opinion articles such as "Howard's End", "Defenestration Down Under", "The Triumph of Tony Abbott", "Australians Turn Away From Malcolm Turnbull", and "Australia’s Left Loses An Election It Was Sure To Win".

References

1971 births
Living people
Australian political writers
People educated at St Aloysius' College (Sydney)
The Spectator editors
University of Sydney alumni
Academic staff of the University of Sydney
ABC radio (Australia) journalists and presenters